Vegard Hansen (born 8 August 1969) is a Norwegian football coach and former player who coaches 1. divisjon club Kongsvinger. During his time at Mjøndalen, the club was promoted to the 1. divisjon in 2008 and reached the play-offs for promotion to the Eliteserien in 2012, 2013 and 2014. In 2014 and 2018 the club won promotion to the top division.

Playing career
As a player, he played for the clubs Strømsgodset, Kongsvinger,  Bristol City F.C., Lofoten, Hønefoss, Stord/Moster and Mjøndalen. He played as a centre back.

Coaching career
He began his coaching career in 2005 as the head coach of Stord/Moster. Ahead of the 2006 season, he took over as head coach at Mjøndalen IF, playing in 3. divisjon (fourth tier) at the time. Hansen led the team to promotion to the 2008 2. divisjon in his first season in charge. Mjøndalen finished in second place in 2. divisjon's group 4 in the 2007 season. In the following 2008 season, Mjøndalen won their second promotion in three years and was promoted to the 2009 1. divisjon. Hansen and Mjøndalen reached the play-offs for promotion to the Tippeligaen in 2012, 2013 and 2014. In 2014 the club won promotion to the Tippeligaen after a 4–1 win on aggregate against Brann in the play-off final. Mjøndalen finished 15th out of sixteen teams in their first season back at the first tier and were relegated. In 2018, they won promotion to Eliteserien after finishing in second place in the 2018 1. divisjon. In the 2019 Eliteserien, Mjøndalen avoided relegation through a last-match victory.

Vegard Hansen was sacked during the summer 2022, after a string of defeats, leaving his post after 17 years as the club's manager.

References

1969 births
Living people
Sportspeople from Drammen
Norwegian footballers
Association football defenders
Strømsgodset Toppfotball players
Kongsvinger IL Toppfotball players
Bristol City F.C. players
FK Lofoten players
Hønefoss BK players
Mjøndalen IF players
Eliteserien players
Norwegian First Division players
English Football League players
Norwegian expatriate footballers
Norwegian expatriate sportspeople in England
Expatriate footballers in England
Norwegian football managers
Eliteserien managers
Mjøndalen IF Fotball managers
Kongsvinger IL Toppfotball managers